Syed Saif Abbas Naqvi (مولانا سيد نقوى) is a Twelver Shia Muslim cleric from India. He is president of the office of Shia Markazi Chand Committee in Lucknow He is one of the prominent Shia clerics of Lucknow.

Family background
He comes from a family of scholars known as "Khandan-e-Ijtehad", and traces his lineage from Dildar Ali Naseerabadi (also known as Ghufran Ma'ab), their ancestors came from Sabzevar.

Positions and activities
He has held following positions:
 President, Shia Markazi Chand Committee, Lucknow
 Managing Director, Hauza Ilmiya Abutalib
 Official Representative of Ayatullah Sadiq Shirazi
 Ex-Member, Haj Committee of India
 Legal Representative, The Grand Islamic Authority Ayatollah Saiyed Sadiq Hussaini al Shirazi
 Controller, Jannat Maab Society
 General Secretary, Darussaqaline Trust
 General Secretary, Maula Ali Orphanage
 President, Najmul Ulema Academy
 President, Markazi Shia Chand Committee
 General Secretary, Shia Religious Charitable Relief Trust
 Shahi Imam, Shahi Masjid, Chota Imambara, Lucknow

Anti profile-pic statement
In 2013, he said, women should not post pictures on Facebook.

Against photo shoots at Bara Imambara complex
In June 2020, he along with Imam-e-Juma of Asafi Mosque at the Bara Imambara Maulana Kalbe Jawad, academician and cleric Maulana Kalbe Sibtain Noori, senior cleric Maulana Agha Roohi, spokesperson of All-India Shia Personal Law Board Maulana Yasoob Abbas and Maulana Abbas Irshad, have all signed the memorandum against photo shoots at Bara Imambara complex.

Involvement in anti-CAA demonstrations and rallies
In March–April 2020, he was involved in Citizenship Amendment Act protests. For which Lucknow Police issued notice to him.

Support to COVID-19 lockdown
In April 2020, he asked people to abide by lockdown norms during the COVID-19 pandemic in India.

See also
 Ijtihadi family

References

External links

Living people
21st-century Muslim scholars of Islam
Scholars from Lucknow
Indian Shia Muslims
Shia scholars of Islam
Indian Islamic religious leaders
Indian Shia clerics
Ijtihadi family
Year of birth missing (living people)